The Gypsy Heart Tour was the third concert tour by American singer Miley Cyrus, held in support of her third studio album Can't Be Tamed (2010). It visited primally Latin America, Australia, and the Philippines; it began on April 29, 2011 in Quito, Ecuador and concluded on July 2, 2011 in Perth, Australia. It was her first tour not to visit the United States. The tour ranked 22nd in Pollstar's "Top 50 Worldwide Tours (Mid-Year)", earning over $26 million.

Background

The tour was announced by media outlets on March 21, 2011, following Cyrus' appearance on Saturday Night Live. Initial tour dates were announced in South America. Dates in Australia, the Philippines, Costa Rica, Panama and Mexico soon followed. During an interview with OK!, Cyrus said she would not bring the tour to the United States due to not feeling comfortable to perform in the country. Many media outlets believed this was due to Cyrus' personal life. She commented:  "I just think right now America has gotten to a place where I don’t know if they want me to tour or not. Right now I just want to go to the places where I am getting the most love and Australia and South America have done that for me. I'm kind of going to the places where I get the most love. I don’t want to go anywhere where I don’t feel completely comfortable with it."
Cyrus stated the tour would not be in the same vein as her previous efforts. She said her previous tour, Wonder World Tour, focused more on theatrics and costume changes. The singer wanted the show to focus on the music and letting the audience see a different side of her that is not portrayed on television. She said the show would feature an acoustic section, along with taking requests from the audience.

Opening acts
Banda Lipstick (Brazil)
 Michael Paynter (Australia)
 Nicole Pillman (Lima)
Lasso (Caracas)
Riva (Bogotá)
Sam Concepcion (Pasay)
Elmo Magalona (Pasay)
Valeria Gastaldi (Buenos Aires)
Greys (Zapopan)

Set list

This set list is from the May 6 show in Buenos Aires, Argentina. It is not intended to represent all tour dates.

"Liberty Walk"
"Party in the U.S.A."
"Kicking and Screaming"
"Robot"
"I Love Rock 'n' Roll" / "Cherry Bomb" / "Bad Reputation"
"Every Rose Has Its Thorn"
"Obsessed"
"Forgiveness and Love"
"Fly on the Wall"
"7 Things"
"Scars"
"Smells Like Teen Spirit"
"Can't Be Tamed"
"Landslide"
"Take Me Along"
"Two More Lonely People"
"The Climb"
Encore
"See You Again"
"My Heart Beats for Love"
"Who Owns My Heart"

Tour dates

Notes

References

2011 concert tours
Miley Cyrus concert tours